Henry Hall was one of two Members of the Parliament of England for the constituency of York from 1601 to 1604.

Life and politics
Henry was the son of Michael Hall of Leventhorpe and Elizabeth Claxton of Burnhall. He was educated at Trinity College, Cambridge in 1561. He was twice married. Firstly to Alice Birkby, with whom he had two sons and three daughters. They were Henry, Grace, Ralph, Margaret and Elizabeth. His second marriage was to Mary Beckwith, the daughter of Alderman William Beckwith. She had been widowed from Thomas Smithson and from Leonard Belt.

He was also the nephew of former Lord mayor of York and MP for the city, Ralph Hall. Henry was made a freeman of the city of York in 1575 and held the offices of Governor (1592 to 1594); Chamberlain (1581 to 1582); Sherriff (1587 to 1587}; Alderman (1598} and Lord Mayor from 1600–1601 and again from 1610–1611. He was elected to the Parliament of 1601. Not much was recorded of his contributions.  

He died in 1620 and was buried in All Saints Church, York.

References

Lord Mayors of York
Members of the Parliament of England for constituencies in Yorkshire